Carlos Daniel Soto (born 20 January 1984), is an Argentinian footballer who last played for Central Córdoba in Argentina, as a centre back / left back.

References

1984 births
Living people
Argentine footballers
People from Clorinda, Formosa
Association football midfielders
Club Atlético Vélez Sarsfield footballers
Gimnasia y Esgrima de Jujuy footballers
All Boys footballers
Nueva Chicago footballers
Aldosivi footballers
Argentine Primera División players
Argentine expatriate footballers
Expatriate footballers in Romania